The 2015–16 season was SønderjyskE's 8th consecutive season in the Danish Superliga.

Season summary
SønderjyskE achieved their highest ever place in Danish football, finishing second. Although never really in contention for the title, in the last weeks of the season the team consolidated their position, finishing nine points behind champions F.C. Copenhagen. As a result, SønderjyskE qualified for continental competition for the first time in their history, entering the Europa League in the second qualifying round.

Players

First-team squad
Squad at end of season

Left club during season

Results

Danish Superliga

League table

References

Notes

2015-16
SønderjyskE Fodbold